The subfamily Rhaphidophorinae contains the single tribe of camel crickets, the Rhaphidophorini, based on the type genus Rhaphidophora.  

Species can be found in: India, southern China, Japan, Indo-China, Malesia and Australasia.

Genera
The Orthoptera Species File lists:
 Diarhaphidophora Gorochov, 2012
 Eurhaphidophora Gorochov, 1999
 Minirhaphidophora Gorochov, 2002
 Neorhaphidophora Gorochov, 1999
 Pararhaphidophora  – monotypic: Pararhaphidophora anatoliji Gorochov, 1999
 Rhaphidophora Serville, 1838
 Sinorhaphidophora Qin, Jiang, Liu & Li, 2018 – monotypic: Sinorhaphidophora hainanensis (Bian & Shi, 2016)
 Stonychophora Karny, 1934

References

External links

Ensifera
Orthoptera subfamilies